Macclesfield is a market town in Cheshire, England.

Macclesfield may also refer to:

 Macclesfield (UK Parliament constituency), a constituency represented in the British House of Commons
 Macclesfield (borough), a local government district and borough in Cheshire, England
 Macclesfield, South Australia, a town in the Adelaide Hills area of South Australia
 Macclesfield, Victoria, another town in Australia
 Macclesfield Bank or Zhongsha Islands is an elongated sunken atoll of underwater reefs and shoals in South China Sea and part of the disputed South China Sea Islands
 Macclesfield, North Carolina, a town in eastern North Carolina, U.S.A.

See also 
Macclesfield railway station (disambiguation)
  – any one of several vessels by that name
 Earl of Macclesfield
 Macclesfield Town F.C., an English football club in Cheshire